The Permanent Mission of Mexico to the United Nations is the diplomatic mission of Mexico to the United Nations in New York. The Mission is represented by the Permanent Representative. The current Mexican Permanent Representative to the United Nations is Juan Ramón de la Fuente.

Location
The Permanent Mission is located on the 28th floor of 2 United Nations Plaza in Manhattan, New York, across the street from United Nations Headquarters. This building was constructed by the United Nations Development Corporation, and is mainly occupied by the United Nations and its subsidiary bodies, as well as by foreign missions to the organization.

History
Mexico was one of the original members of the United Nations, having been present at the United Nations Conference on International Organization. It officially became a member of the United Nations on November 7, 1945.

The first Permanent Representative of Mexico at the United Nations was Luis Padilla Nervo, who would later serve as President of the General Assembly for its sixth session, as well as represent Mexico on the Security Council.

Since joining the organization, Mexico has been one of its biggest proponents. It has repeatedly stressed that the United Nations should be the highest multilateral forum for seeking collective solutions to global problems, as well as providing the best framework for agreeing upon common strategies. Additionally, Mexico has participated in all major United Nations bodies since 1946, and has been ranked among the world's biggest contributors to the United Nations budget. In 2018, it contributed $34.8 million to the regular budget.

In its history at the United Nations, Mexico has sat on the Security Council five times, and on the Economic and Social Council 14 times. It has also presided over the Security Council seven times as President of the Security Council, and once over the General Assembly as President of the General Assembly. Mexican delegates have also served as Vice-president of the General Assembly a total of seven times.

Role
The main role of the Mission is to act as the intermediary between the United Nations, and the current Mexican administration. Additionally, some of its principle functions include:
 Collaborating in the formulation of strategies that govern Mexico's actions before the United Nations and its subsidiary bodies
 Participating in all meeting convened by United Nations bodies, as well as specialized agencies, keeping in mind Mexican national interests
 This includes negotiating international treaties and agreements that are of interest to Mexico
 Carrying out necessary actions to promote the initiatives of Mexico before the United Nations and it subsidiary bodies, as well as other international organizations
 Promoting candidacies that are of interest to Mexico within the framework of the United Nations
 Participating in the mechanisms of establishing quotas, as well as allocation of the budget of the United Nations
 Accrediting the actions of Mexican delegates participating in United Nations meetings

Mexican priorities
The following are Mexico's priorities within the United Nations system:
 Disarmament
 International peace and security
 Sustainable peace
 Peacekeeping missions and their operations
 Fighting crime
 Human rights
 Protecting minorities and vulnerable groups
 Sustainable development
 Economic and social development
 International rights

Permanent Representatives of Mexico to the United Nations

Below is a list of the permanent representatives of Mexico at the United Nations since its creation:

See also
 Foreign relations of Mexico
 Permanent Mission of Mexico to the United Nations in Geneva
 Mexico and the United Nations

Other Mexican representation in the United Nations system
To the UN offices:
 Permanent Representative of Mexico to the United Nations Office and International Organizations in Geneva
 Permanent Representative of Mexico to the United Nations Office and International Organizations in Vienna (assumed by its Austrian Embassy)
To the other United Nations organs:
 Permanent Mission of Mexico to the International Civil Aviation Organization
 Permanent Mission of Mexico to the United Nations Offices in Rome 
 Permanent Mission of Mexico to the United Nations Educational, Scientific and Cultural Organization

References

 
Mexico
United Nations
United States
Mexico
Mexico and the United Nations
Mexico–United States relations